Networked: The New Social Operating System is a book by Lee Rainie and  published in 2012.

References

2012 non-fiction books
MIT Press books